John Douglas (born 18 December 1934, Woolwich) was a Scottish international rugby player.

He was educated at Stewart's Melville College in Edinburgh and first played rugby for the school XV. During his National Service he played for the B.A.O.R and when back in civilian life played for Blackheath. He returned to Scotland and played for Stewart's Melville Former Pupils RFC and Edinburgh before his first cap for Scotland in 1961. He was capped twelve times as No 8 for Scotland between 1961 and 1963. 

He took part in the 1962 British Lions tour to South Africa, although not selected for any test appearances, and also for the Barbarians tours of 1961 and 1965. He was a successful Rugby Sevens player.

In later life he became a racehorse owner. His horse Rubstic won the 1979 Grand National.

His elder son Struan Douglas is a Scottish Rugby League international and his younger son Nigel Douglas played rugby for Scottish School boys, premier rugby for Dundee HSRFP and district rugby for North and Midlands.

References

 ESPN Scrum - England/Players and Officials/John Douglas
 Stewart's Melville FP - J.Douglas

1934 births
Living people
British & Irish Lions rugby union players from Scotland
People educated at Stewart's Melville College
Rugby union players from Woolwich
Scotland international rugby union players
Scottish racehorse owners and breeders
Rugby union fullbacks
Blackheath F.C. players